Vladimir Nikolov may refer to:
Vladimir Nikolov (volleyball) (born 1977), Bulgarian former volleyball player
Vladimir Nikolov (footballer) (born 2001), Bulgarian footballer